Adam Gachet, sometimes written Adam Gashet, was a Baptist minister and state legislator in Alabama. He represented Barbour County, Alabama. He was enslaved until 1865. He is commemorated on a historical marker listing state legislators in Alabama who were African American and served during the Reconstruction era.

See also
African-American officeholders during and following the Reconstruction era
Election Riot of 1874

References

African-American state legislators in Alabama
Members of the Alabama House of Representatives
Year of birth missing
Year of death missing
People from Barbour County, Alabama
Baptists from Alabama
Baptist ministers from the United States
African-American politicians during the Reconstruction Era
19th-century American slaves
African-American Baptist ministers